Zygoballus gracilipes is a species of jumping spider which occurs in South America. It was first described by the biologist Jocelyn Crane in 1945. The type specimens are housed at The American Museum of Natural History in New York City.

The species has been collected from Kartabo, Guyana, and Bernardo de Irigoyen, Argentina.

References

External links

Zygoballus gracilipes at Worldwide database of jumping spiders
Zygoballus gracilipes at Salticidae: Diagnostic Drawings Library

Salticidae
Spiders of South America
Taxa named by Jocelyn Crane
Spiders described in 1945